Flavobacterium compostarboris is a Gram-negative and aerobic bacterium from the genus of Flavobacterium which has been isolated from leaf-and-branch compost from the Expo Commemoration Park in Osaka in Japan.

References

External links
Type strain of Flavobacterium compostarboris at BacDive -  the Bacterial Diversity Metadatabase

compostarboris
Bacteria described in 2012